(also known as), was a Swedish-language, co-educational private educational institution in Helsinki, Finland, from 1888 to 1977.

History 
 was founded in the spring of 1888 as an educational institution with nine levels. The founders were head teacher Viktor Heikel (son of educator Henrik Heikel), assessor Uno Kurtén, private teacher Helena Alfthan and philosophy master Albin Lönnbeck.

The school was founded after a conflict among the teaching staff at Läroverket för gossar och flickor, which led to the founders breaking away and founding a new school. The school was owned by its founders from 1888 to 1899 and by the foundation  from 1899 to 1977

 was one of the leading co-educational schools in Finland during the autonomous period. The curricula was continuously developed until the Russification of Finland (1899-1905 and 1908-1917) when all curricula were aligned. During the First World War, as many as 24 of the school's students and staff joined the Jäger movement. One of them was historian Eirik Hornborg, who was the school's principal at the time. 

The school began its operations in Standertskjöld's stone house at Norra kajen 4 in 1888. The following year it moved to a building owned by founder Viktor Heikel on Bulvarden 7-9. In 1911  moved to a building on Andrégatan 12 (later Lönnrotsgatan). By the end of the 1940s, the building was in need of renovation and not big enough to accommodate the growing number of students. The City of Helsinki donated a plot of land by Töölöntori and architect Hilding Ekelund was tasked with planning a school building for 450 students. In 1954,  moved in to the brand new building on Sandelsgatan 3. 

When the Finnish education system was reformed in 1977,  was split into the högstadium  and the gymnasium . The building on Sandelsgatan 3 has housed Tölö gymnasium since 2015.

Principals 

 1888-1914 Albin Lönnbeck
 1914-1916 Eirik Hornborg
 1916-1917 Johannes Sundström
 1917-1918 Eirik Hornborg
 1918-1945 Johannes Sundström
 1945-1965 Leo Backman
 1965-1967 Walter von Koskull
 1968-1973 Paul Hägglund
 1973-1977 Boris Lönnqvist

Famous alumni 

 Lars Ahlfors, mathematician, remembered for his work in the field of Riemann surfaces and his text on complex analysis.
 Kaj Arnö, businessman, columnist
 Eva Biaudet, politician, former minister
Staffan Bruun, journalist, author
 Henrik Dettmann, professional basketball coach
 Ilmi Hallsten, teacher, activist, politician
 Erik Heinrichs, military general, Finland's Chief of the General Staff during the Interim Peace and Continuation War
Barbara Helsingius, singer, fencer
 Eirik Hornborg, politician, historian, principal, author
Mirjam Kalland, professor
Herman Lindqvist, journalist, author
Birgitta Lindström, Wimbledon champion 1966
 Jenny Markelin-Svensson, Finland's first female engineer 
Yrsa Stenius, journalist, author 
 Astrid Thors, politician, former minister
Birgitta Ulfsson, actor, director
 Björn Wahlroos, businessman, investor
Harald Öhquist, Lieutenant General during World War II

References 

Schools in Helsinki
Educational institutions established in 1888
Educational institutions disestablished in 1977
1888 establishments in Finland
Swedish-speaking population of Finland